The Roman Catholic Archdiocese of Cascavel is an archdiocese located in the city of Cascavel in Brazil.

History
 May 5, 1978: Established as Diocese of Cascavel from the Diocese of Toledo
 October 16, 1979: Promoted as Metropolitan Archdiocese of Cascavel

Leadership
 Bishops of Cascavel
Armando Círio, O.S.I. (later Archbishop) (1978.05.05 – 1979.10.16)
 Archbishops of Cascavel
 Armando Círio, O.S.I. (1979.10.16 – 1995.12.27)
 Lúcio Ignácio Baumgaertner (1995.12.27 – 2007.10.31)
 Mauro Aparecido dos Santos (2007.10.31 – 2021.03.11)
 Adelar Baruffi (2021.09.22 – ...)

Other priests of this diocese who became bishops
José Antônio Peruzzo, appointed Bishop of Palmas-Francisco Beltrão, Parana in 2005
Nélio Domingos Zortea, appointed Bishop of Jataí, Goias in 2015

Suffragan dioceses
 Diocese of Foz do Iguaçu
 Diocese of Palmas–Francisco Beltrão
 Diocese of Toledo

Sources
 GCatholic.org
 Catholic Hierarchy
 Archdiocese website

Cascavel
Roman Catholic dioceses in Brazil
Roman Catholic ecclesiastical provinces in Brazil
 
Christian organizations established in 1978
Roman Catholic dioceses and prelatures established in the 20th century